William Winfield Rutan (March 28, 1865 – May 9, 1937) was an American-born merchant and political figure in Saskatchewan, Canada. He represented Prince Albert in the House of Commons of Canada from 1908 to 1911 as a Liberal.

He was born in Le Sueur, Minnesota, the son of Andrew Rutan, a Canadian by birth. Rutan was educated in Mankato, Minnesota, and Battle Creek, Michigan and came to Canada in 1897, settling in Melfort, Saskatchewan. In 1890, he had married Josie Lasley. He was defeated when he ran for reelection in 1911.

Electoral record

References

Members of the House of Commons of Canada from Saskatchewan
Liberal Party of Canada MPs
1865 births
1937 deaths